Mickaël Brisset (born 26 March 1985) is a French footballer who plays as a forward for Régional 3 club Creil.

Career
Due to a birth defect he has no left forearm.

He played on the professional level in Ligue 2 for Angers SCO.

In 2020, Brisset signed with Régional 3 club Creil, which would become the nineteenth club he played for.

References

External links
Mickaël Brisset profile at foot-national.com

1985 births
Living people
French footballers
French expatriate footballers
Expatriate footballers in Belgium
Ligue 2 players
Angers SCO players
Angoulême Charente FC players
Paris FC players
FC Lorient players
UR La Louvière Centre players
US Ivry players
Racing Besançon players
Association football forwards
FC Chambly Oise players
FCM Aubervilliers players
AS Beauvais Oise players
Louhans-Cuiseaux FC players
Racing Club de France Football players
Paris 13 Atletico players